Artsyom Uladzimiravich Rakhmanaw (born 10 July 1990) is a Belarusian professional footballer.

Club career
Born in Minsk, Rakhmanaw began playing football in FC Minsk's youth system. He joined the senior team and made his Belarusian Premier League debut in 2009.

On 14 January 2022, Rakhmanaw signed for Astana on a contract until the end of 2023. On 9 January 2023, Rakhmanaw left Astana after his contract was terminated by mutual agreement.

International career
He made his debut for the Belarus national football team on 2 September 2021 in a World Cup qualifier against the Czech Republic, a 0–1 away loss. He started and played the whole game.

Honours
Minsk
Belarusian Cup winner: 2012–13

Astana
Kazakhstan Premier League winner: 2022

References

External links

1990 births
Living people
Footballers from Minsk
Belarusian footballers
Belarus under-21 international footballers
Belarus international footballers
Association football defenders
Belarusian expatriate footballers
Expatriate footballers in Estonia
Expatriate footballers in Moldova
Expatriate footballers in Ukraine
Expatriate footballers in Poland
Expatriate footballers in Sweden
Expatriate footballers in Kazakhstan
Belarusian expatriate sportspeople in Estonia
Belarusian expatriate sportspeople in Moldova
Belarusian expatriate sportspeople in Ukraine
Belarusian expatriate sportspeople in Poland
Belarusian expatriate sportspeople in Sweden
Belarusian expatriate sportspeople in Kazakhstan
Meistriliiga players
Allsvenskan players
FC Minsk players
FC Slavia Mozyr players
FC Neman Grodno players
FCI Levadia Tallinn players
FC Milsami Orhei players
FC Chornomorets Odesa players
Raków Częstochowa players
FC Isloch Minsk Raion players
AFC Eskilstuna players
FC Rukh Brest players
FC Astana players